Abnér was an Irish Abbot who died 760.

Abnér was abbot of Imleach Iubhair in what is now County Tipperary. In pre-history, it was known as Medón Mairtine, or central Mairtine. The Mairtine was an extremely powerful group in pre-historic Munster.

References

8th-century Irish abbots
People from County Tipperary
Date of birth unknown
760 deaths